Robert Thomas Rush (9 October 1880 – 13 March 1975) was an Australian rules footballer who played for the Collingwood Football Club in the Victorian Football League (VFL).

Family
The son of Roger Robert Rush (1856–1941), and Mary Rush (1856–1943), née Berry, Robert Thomas Rush was born at Richmond, Victoria, on 9 October 1880.

Wife
He married Eileen Mary Maguire on 28 November 1911.

Siblings
Four of his seven brothers also played VFL football (they are the only set of five brothers to play in the VFL/AFL):
 William Leopold "Leo" Rush (1890–1983), who played with Melbourne in 1911, and with Richmond in 1912.
 Bryan Joseph Rush (1893–1982), played with Collingwood in 1913 and 1914.
 Gerald Vincent Rush (1895–1988), played with Richmond in 1920.
 Kevin Patrick Rush (1901–1984), played with Richmond in 1923 and 1924.

Football
Rush was a pacy defender and played mainly on a half-back flank, although he was also used in the back pockets. He was a member of Collingwood's 1902 and 1903 premierships.

Administrator
After retiring as a player, Rush continued to serve Collingwood in a variety of roles over the years, including committeeman, assistant secretary and treasurer. He eventually resigned from his last official position, that of committeeman, in mid-1950<ref>[https://trove.nla.gov.au/newspaper/article/206232925 Beames, Percy, "Collingwood Dispute: Committee Resigns, Election on June 28',  The Age, (Wednesday, 24 May 1950), p.24.]</ref> as a consequence of the controversy that ensued over the appointment of Bervin Woods as coach of the First XVIII.

In 1930, Rush performed match-day coaching duties to lead the club to its fourth consecutive premiership, filling in for Jock McHale who was ill; however, following a decision by AFL historians in 2014, McHale is now credited as Collingwood's sole coach in the game for the purposes of coaching statistics.

He is credited with having coined the Collingwood club motto of Floreat Pica ("May the Magpies Prosper").

Australian National Football Council
Rush was president of the Australian National Football Council from 1935 to 1946, heading the body that was in charge of the laws of Australian football.

Death
He died on 13 March 1975, aged 94.

See also
 List of Australian rules football families

Footnotes

References
 Ross, J. (ed), 100 Years of Australian Football 1897–1996: The Complete Story of the AFL, All the Big Stories, All the Great Pictures, All the Champions, Every AFL Season Reported'', Viking, (Ringwood), 1996.

External links

 
 
 
 Bob Rush: Boyles Football Photos.

1880 births
1975 deaths
Australian rules footballers from Melbourne
Collingwood Football Club players
Collingwood Football Club Premiership players
Collingwood Football Club coaches
Collingwood Football Club administrators
Australian rules football administrators
Two-time VFL/AFL Premiership players
People from Richmond, Victoria